The 1879 Cincinnati Reds season was a season in American baseball. The team finished fifth in the National League with a record of 43–37, 14 games behind the Providence Grays.

Regular season
The Reds were hoping to build off a great 1878 season, in which the team finished in second place in the National League with a 37–23 record. In the off-season, the Reds announced that catcher Deacon White would become the player-manager. Cincinnati signed Ross Barnes to play shortstop. Barnes had missed most of the 1877 season and all of the 1878 season after falling ill. In his last full season in 1876, Barnes played with the Chicago White Stockings, and led the NL with a .429 batting average, 138 hits, 126 runs, 38 doubles, and fourteen triples.

King Kelly had a very solid season, hitting .348 with two home runs and 47 RBI, while another youngster, twenty-year-old Buttercup Dickerson, hit .291 with two home runs and a team high 57 RBI. Deacon White rebounded from a poor 1878 season by his standards, as he hit .330 with a homer and 52 RBI. On the mound, Will White led the NL with 75 starts, as he had a 43–31 record with a 1.99 ERA in his league high 680 innings pitched.

Season summary 
Cincinnati started off hot, as they opened the season with a five-game winning streak. However, the club lost seven of their next eight games to fall under .500. Cincinnati had a mediocre 9–9 record after eighteen games, and player-manager Deacon White turned over his managerial duties to Cal McVey, who had been the Reds' player-manager in 1878. Cincinnati lost the first five games under McVey, however, the team began to play better, and ended the season with a 43–37 record, fifth in the league, and fourteen games behind the first-place Grays.

Season standings

Record vs. opponents

Roster

Player stats

Batting

Starters by position
Note: Pos = Position; G = Games played; AB = At bats; H = Hits; Avg. = Batting average; HR = Home runs; RBI = Runs batted in

Other batters
Note: G = Games played; AB = At bats; H = Hits; Avg. = Batting average; HR = Home runs; RBI = Runs batted in

Pitching

Starting pitchers
Note: G = Games pitched; IP = Innings pitched; W = Wins; L = Losses; ERA = Earned run average; SO = Strikeouts

Other pitchers
Note: G = Games pitched; IP = Innings pitched; W = Wins; L = Losses; ERA = Earned run average; SO = Strikeouts

References

Cincinnati Reds
Cincinnati Reds season
Cincinnati